"Doctor Bashir, I Presume?" is the 114th episode of the syndicated American science fiction television series Star Trek: Deep Space Nine, the 16th episode of the fifth season. This episode guest stars actor Robert Picardo, who played the role of the Emergency Medical Hologram on Star Trek: Voyager; in this episode, Picardo portrays the EMH's creator, Dr. Lewis Zimmerman. The episode also features guest performances by Brian George and anthropologist Fadwa El Guindi as the parents of Dr. Julian Bashir.

Set in the 24th century, the series follows the adventures of the crew of the Starfleet-managed Bajoran space station Deep Space Nine. In this episode, Dr. Lewis Zimmerman comes to DS9 to create a medical hologram based on Dr. Bashir, leading to the revelation that Bashir was genetically modified as a child.

The episode's title refers to the famous quotation attributed to Henry Morton Stanley on encountering the medical missionary and explorer, Doctor Livingstone.

Plot
Hologram engineer Lewis Zimmerman comes to Deep Space Nine with the intent of using Dr. Bashir's likeness as a template for a holographic program designed to provide medical treatment. In order to make the program as robust as possible, Zimmerman needs a complete personality profile on Bashir. Against Bashir's wishes, Zimmerman invites Julian's estranged parents, Amsha and Richard Bashir, to the station to be interviewed.

Julian is embarrassed by his father's tendency toward self-aggrandizement. For example, Richard references a time he "ran shuttles" when, in fact, he was merely a steward and was fired shortly into his career. Julian implores his parents not to reveal to Zimmerman anything about a secret from his childhood, and they are angered that he thinks they would be so sloppy.

Later, his parents go to the infirmary to try to assuage their son's fears, stating emphatically that they will not tell Zimmerman that they had Julian illegally genetically modified when he was a child. However, they are unaware that they are speaking to Zimmerman's new hologram, rather than to their son. Zimmerman and Chief O'Brien are in the next room and hear everything they say.

O'Brien informs Julian about what he heard. Julian is furious, but confirms that he was genetically modified as a child. He was a poor student, apparently had a learning disability, and seemed destined for failure; his parents took him for DNA resequencing, greatly improving his intelligence and his physicality. With the secret out, Bashir sees no alternative but to resign from Starfleet; genetically modified individuals are banned from Starfleet and from practicing medicine.

Before Bashir can tender his resignation, his parents take matters into their own hands. Richard strikes a deal with the Judge Advocate General: Richard will spend two years in a minimum security prison for illegal genetic engineering, and Julian is allowed to retain his commission and his medical license. Julian makes some peace with his parents as they depart for Earth, grateful for his father's sacrifice.

Meanwhile, Zimmerman pursues Dabo girl Leeta's affections, asking her to accompany him back to Jupiter Station. Shy Rom is too scared to say anything to convince her to stay, although Leeta would welcome any reason to stay with him. She is on the verge of leaving with Zimmerman when Rom careens around the corner and gives her the long-awaited reason to stay: "I love you." Leeta reciprocates, and agrees to stay.

Production

The episode began as a way to bring actor Robert Picardo and his character the Emergency Medical Hologram to Deep Space Nine.

Amsha Bashir is portrayed by Fadwa El Guindi, an anthropologist with no previous screen acting experience, at the time a professor at UCLA. She was invited to audition for the role by Ron Surma, who saw her community theatre performance in Mahjar, a play she co-wrote and co-directed.

Related episodes
The villainous character of Khan Noonien Singh, introduced in the episode "Space Seed" of Star Trek: The Original Series, is mentioned in this episode as an example of the possible dangerous consequences of genetic manipulation. "Statistical Probabilities" and "Chrysalis", later episodes of Deep Space Nine, feature Bashir working with other genetically-modified characters whose modifications were not as successful as his.

Reception 
Keith DeCandido of Tor.com rated the episode 7 out of 10. Cinefantastique gave it 2.5 out of 5.

In 2012, Den of Geek ranked this the ninth best episode of Star Trek: Deep Space Nine.

References

External links

 

Star Trek: Deep Space Nine (season 5) episodes
1997 American television episodes
Television episodes about eugenics
Television episodes written by Ronald D. Moore
Television episodes directed by David Livingston